Dobeno is a settlement in the Municipality of Mengeš in the Upper Carniola region of Slovenia.

References

External links 

Dobeno on Geopedia

Populated places in the Municipality of Mengeš